Guisande may refer to the following places in Portugal:

Guisande (Braga), a parish in the municipality of Braga
Guisande (Santa Maria da Feira), a parish in the municipality of Santa Maria da Feira